Glendon is an unincorporated community in Fayette County, in the U.S. state of Ohio.

History
An early variant name was Rattlesnake. A post office called Rattlesnake was established in 1889, and remained in operation until 1904. Glendon (or Glenden) had 25 inhabitants in 1910.

References

Unincorporated communities in Fayette County, Ohio
Unincorporated communities in Ohio